"Vent" is a song by the American band Collective Soul. It is the second single from their fifth studio album Blender.

Overview
The song was originally titled "Prick", but was changed to "Vent" due to concern from the band's record label, Atlantic Records. The song is supposedly about the band's tension with the label. The band left the label in 2001, and created their own independent label, El Music Group.

Charts

References

2000 songs
2001 singles
Atlantic Records singles
Collective Soul songs
Songs written by Ed Roland